State Route 56 (SR 56) is a primary state highway in the U.S. state of Virginia.  The state highway runs  from U.S. Route 11 (US 11) at Steeles Tavern east to US 60 near Buckingham.  SR 56 is the main east–west highway of Nelson County.  The state highway connects the county seat of Lovingston with Buckingham to the east and the Blue Ridge Mountains and the Shenandoah Valley to the west.

Route description

SR 56 begins at an intersection with US 11 (Lee Highway) at Steeles Tavern a short distance east of the historic Cyrus McCormick Farm.  The junction is just north of the Augusta–Rockbridge county line.  SR 56 heads southeast into Rockbridge County as Tye River Turnpike, which enters George Washington National Forest and passes under Norfolk Southern Railway's Roanoke District at the village of Vesuvius.  The state highway follows Little Marys Creek along its winding ascent of the Blue Ridge Mountains.  SR 56 intersects the Blue Ridge Parkway at Tye River Gap, where the highway enters Nelson County and becomes Crabtree Falls Highway.  The state highway descends through Montebello and follows the South Fork of the Tye River past Crabtree Falls to Nash, where the highway begins to follow the Tye River proper.

SR 56 leaves the national forest and enters more gentle terrain just west of Tyro, the site of the Tyro Mill.  The state highway follows the Tye River through Massies Mill to Roseland, where the highway turns south to join SR 151 on Patrick Henry Highway.  The two highways run through the hamlet of Hendersons Store to just north of Piney River, where the highways diverge at a wye intersection; the short connecter between SR 151 south and SR 56 east is SR 151Y.  SR 56 heads east as Tye Brook Highway, which heads east and crosses the Tye River before intersecting US 29 (Thomas Nelson Highway) at Colleen.  The two highways run concurrently northeast past historic Mitchell's Brick House Tavern, contemporary Nelson County High School, and historic Lovingston High School on their way to Lovingston.

SR 56 splits northeast from US 29 along Front Street, which also carries US 29 Business.  At the south end of the Lovingston Historic District, SR 56 turns southeast onto James River Road.  SR 56 heads southeast through an at-grade crossing of Norfolk Southern's Washington District at Shipman.  The state highway passes through a gap between Findlay Mountain and Thomas Mountain to Red Apple Orchard.  At Wingina, SR 56 passes the historic home Soldier's Joy and has an at-grade intersection with CSX's Rivanna Subdivision, then crosses the James River into Buckingham County.  The state highway passes through Woods Corner before reaching its eastern terminus at US 60 (James Anderson Highway) in Alcoma west of the county seat of Buckingham.

Major intersections

References

External links

Virginia Highways Project: VA 56

056
State Route 056
State Route 056
State Route 056
State Route 056
Virginia Byways